Bolshaya Treshchevka is a rural locality (a selo) in Somovskoye Rural Settlement, Ramonsky District, Voronezh Oblast, Russia. The population was 66 as of 2010. There are 7 streets.

Geography 
Bolshaya Treshchevka is located 44 km west of Ramon (the district's administrative centre) by road. Somovo is the nearest rural locality.

References 

Rural localities in Ramonsky District